National Route 405 is a national highway of Japan connecting Nakanojō, Gunma and Jōetsu, Niigata in Japan, with a total length of 109.6 km (68.1 mi).

References

National highways in Japan
Roads in Gunma Prefecture
Roads in Nagano Prefecture
Roads in Niigata Prefecture